Mount Reunion is a peak in the Sawtooth Mountains of northern Minnesota, in the United States.  It is located about a mile west of the west end of Mountain Lake in Cook County.

The mountain was so named due to its being a designated rendezvous point for the crews of the Minnesota Geological Survey.

Notes

Reunion
Mountains of Cook County, Minnesota